The Association of Catholic Priests (ACP) is a liberal, independent and voluntary association of Catholic clergy in Ireland. The association was established on 1 September 2010 with the claimed objective of having "a forum, and a voice to reflect, discuss and comment on issues affecting the Irish Church and society today". One of its founders was Tony Flannery who, in April 2012, was disciplined by the Congregation for the Doctrine of the Faith for questioning whether Jesus Christ had instituted the Catholic priesthood. His brother Frank Flannery is a former General Secretary of the Fine Gael party. Its lay, sister organisation is the Association of Catholics in Ireland.

Theology
The ACP says that it accepts the Creed and that it does not seek to overturn the defined teaching of the Catholic Church but these are questionable claims given its attempts to undermine settled Church teaching on issues like adultery and contraception. The organisation took a neutral stance in Ireland's 2015 gay marriage referendum and 2018 abortion referendum. During the latter referendum, the ACP spoke out against priests allowing 'No' campaigners to address congregations during Mass.

Vocations
In June 2014, the issue of vocations was discussed at the Irish Catholic Bishops Conference in Maynooth. The ACP called for the Church to have a plan for vocations. Father Sean McDonagh says that the Church is "facing an implosion in terms of vocations to the priesthood.". In this regard, the ACP advocates the appointment of female deacons. According to McDonagh: "It’s fairly clear historically that women have served in the Church, despite every effort to silence their voices since the 4th century."

The ACP also called for men who left the priesthood to marry to be called back to ministry in some form. McDonagh claimed that if the ACP's recommendations were not acted on, parish churches could be forced to close down.

In October 2019, former President of Ireland Mary McAleese spoke at a conference organised by the Association of Catholic Priests, which was titled 'Women and the Church: Equality of Opportunity?'.

Communion
The report of the apostolic visitation to Ireland expressed some concerns about the communio (communion or unity) of the Church. The ACP claims "We cherish and we value and we wish to further the unity of all our people, with our fellow clergy, with Religious, with our bishops and with the Successor of Peter."

Censure
Members of the association have been censured by the Roman Curia. The Congregation for the Doctrine of the Faith (CDF) placed restrictions on the association's founder, Fr Tony Flannery who is a member of the Redemptorist Congregation. He was advised by Rome to go to a monastery where he might "pray and reflect" on his heterodox views and his role with the association. His monthly column in the congregation's monthly magazine, "Reality", has been discontinued. Restrictions have also been imposed on the magazine itself and its editor, Fr Gerard Moloney.<ref>Irish Times, Vatican moves to quell internal dissenting voices", 6 April 2012. Retrieved 20 May 2012</ref>

Supporters of the censure cite that the Vatican has "a sacred obligation to investigate any religious whose teaching is contrary to that of the church: to defend those sacred teachings: and to protect the faithful from all taint of error and corruption." Other supporters advocate that those censured by the CDF are free to set up a rival church: "Those with strong private theories and opinions have plenty of churches to choose from and, if they find none to their liking, they can always set up another.
Since that time, it has emerged that three other priests have also been silenced: Marist priest Fr Seán Fagan, Capuchin priest Fr Owen O'Sullivan and Passionist priest Fr Brian D'Arcy.

At a conference organised by the ACP in Dublin's Regency Hotel, Fr Brendan Hoban told the gathering "that clamping down on "wayward" opinions was not the way to deal with issues".

Achievements
Its intervention in the case of Fr Kevin Reynolds, who was libelled in RTÉ's "Prime Time Investigates" programme – Mission to Prey – in May 2011 was instrumental in securing an apology from the broadcaster.

In April 2012 it published a survey that it commissioned which revealed that nine out of 10 of the 1,000 interviewed practising Catholics (35 per cent attend Mass once a week, 51 per cent once or more each month and 20 per cent a few times a year) said priests should be allowed to marry, with 77 per cent believing women should be ordained and three-quarters of respondents not seeing Catholic Church teachings on sexuality as relevant to them or to their family."Survey Finds Irish Catholics 'want married priests'", BBC News Northern Ireland 13 April 2012, accessed 22 May 2012

On 30 May 2012, a steering group under the umbrella of the ACP met in All Hallows College, Dublin. The meeting, was attended by about 200 people and resulted in the establishment of a new lay organisation for Irish Catholics with an interim title of the "Association of Catholics in Ireland". The new association committed itself to "the renewal of the Catholic faith in the changed and changing circumstances of the 21st century and to the reform of the institutional church which, at this time, is experiencing conflict, crisis and lack of credibility". In November 2012, at a meeting attended by over 300 people, the objectives of the Association of Catholics in Ireland were formally approved.

Criticism
The Association of Catholic Priests has been criticised by conservative Catholics, with social and religious commentator David Quinn describing it as a "sub-section of priests who want the Catholic Church to adopt the failed project of liberal Protestantism." Michael Kelly, editor of The Irish Catholic'' disputed the suggestion by the ACP that the ordination of married men and women would reverse the decline in vocations for the priesthood, citing the steep decline in membership and vocations in the Church of England and mainstream Protestant denominations in Northern Europe, all of which ordain married men and women. American Traditionalist Catholic news organisation Church Militant has referred to the ACP as a "group of dissident priests".

See also
 We Are Church
 Call To Action

References

External links

Catholic Encyclopedia: Canon Law
Document establishing the 1983 Code of Canon Law
 Home page of Sean O'Conaill
 Association of US Catholic Priests

Catholic Church in Ireland
Volunteer cooperatives
Catholic organizations established in the 21st century
Catholic dissident organizations